Cirripectes hutchinsi is a species of combtooth blenny found in coral reefs in the eastern Indian ocean, around western Australia.  This species reaches a length of  SL. The specific name honours the curator of fish at the Western Australian Museum in Perth, Barry Hutchins.

References

hutchinsi
Taxa named by Jeffrey T. Williams
Fish described in 1988